Gökçeyazı can refer to:

 Gökçeyazı, Ilgaz
 Gökçeyazı, Kaş